Chkheidze is a Georgian family name which is – apart from the capital Tbilisi – most frequently to be found in the western Adjara, Guria and Imereti and the eastern Kvemo Kartli and Kakheti regions of Georgia. Most Chkheidzes live in the Tbilisi (1,026), Khoni (260), Kutaisi (206), Zestafoni (183), Batumi (118), Baghdati (107) and Rustavi (89) districts.

Chkheidze were dukes of Duchy of Racha.

Notable members 
Alexandre Chkheidze (1878–1940), Polish-Georgian military officer
Giorgi Chkheidze (born 1997), Georgian weightlifter
Goga Chkheidze (born 1996), Georgian weightlifter
Irakli Chkheidze (born 1999), Georgian weightlifter
Konstantin Chkheidze (1897–1974), Czech-Georgian-Russian writer and philosopher
Nato Chkheidze
Nikolay Chkheidze (1864–1926), Georgian politician
Nikoloz Chkheidze (born 1968), former Soviet and Georgian footballer
Nutsa Chkheidze (1881–1963), Georgian stage actress
Otar Chkheidze (1920–2007), Georgian writer
Revaz Chkheidze (1926–2015), Soviet and Georgian film director
Temur Chkheidze (born 1943), Soviet, Georgian and Russian theater director.
Temur Chkheidze (born 1986), Georgian weightlifter
 Valeri Chkheidze (1948 ) ( head and founder of independent Georgian border guards)

See also 
Chkhetidze, a Georgian noble family from the tenth century

References 

Georgian-language surnames